The Marathon Rowing Championship is a continuous  rowing regatta on the Cane River Lake in Natchitoches, Louisiana. Northwestern State University is the official host of the regatta. The Marathon begins near the Melrose Plantation and ends at Front Street in Natchitoches. The regatta is open to all sculling and sweep-oar rowing boats.  On the day of the Marathon, the Cane River is open only to competitors.

The regatta is much longer than most head races, but shorter than the  Boston Rowing Marathon. The majority of crews do not even practice on bodies of water that allow them to row  without stopping and turning around (usually due to lake size or the presence of a river dam or lock).

The Marathon Rowing Championship did not take place in 2010 or 2011 due to low water during an extreme regional drought.

The record time for this event is 2 hours, 31 minutes, 20 seconds set in 2008. A more typical time it takes to complete the course is 3 to 4 hours.

External links 
 18 years, 26.2 miles & 108 boats The Current Sauce—Northwestern State University of Louisiana.
 Regatta info on Northwestern State University website
 1993 results
 1998 results
 1999 results
 2000 results
 2001 results
 2001 results
 2003 results
 2004 results
 2005 results
 2006 results
 2007 results
 2008 results

References

Rowing competitions in the United States
College rowing competitions in the United States
Endurance games
Tourist attractions in Natchitoches Parish, Louisiana
Northwestern State University
Annual sporting events in the United States
Sports competitions in Louisiana